Bengbu Prison is a prison in Bengbu, Anhui, China. It was established in 1958. The prison houses severe criminals and on average holds roughly 2,000 inmates. The prison enterprise mainly deals with the processing and production of rubber hoses.

See also
List of prisons in Anhui

References
Laogai Research Foundation Handbook

Prisons in Anhui
1958 establishments in China
Bengbu